Zazi Maidan, also Jaji Maidan and Dzadzi Maidan, is a village and the center of Zazi Maidan District, Khost Province, Afghanistan. It is located at 1,020 m altitude.

See also
 Aryob, also called Zazi Aryob, town in Paktia Province, Afghanistan

References

External links

Populated places in Khost Province